River Forest is a Metra commuter railroad station in River Forest, Illinois, a western suburb of Chicago, on the Union Pacific West Line. Trains go east to Ogilvie Transportation Center in Chicago and as far west as Elburn, Illinois. Travel time to Ogilvie is 20 to 24 minutes. , River Forest is the 107th busiest of the 236 non-downtown stations in the Metra system, with an average of 448 weekday boardings. Unless otherwise announced, inbound trains use the north (side) platform and outbound trains use the south (island) platform.

As of 2022, River Forest is served by 43 trains (21 inbound, 22 outbound) on weekdays, by all 10 trains in each direction on Saturdays, and by all nine trains in each direction on Sundays and holidays.

The station is at Central Avenue and Thatcher Avenue. The surrounding neighborhood is mostly characterized by single-family homes, baseball fields and tennis courts. Pace suburban buses stop one block to the north on Lake Street. To the east is an overpass that carries the Canadian National Railway's Waukesha Subdivision into Forest Park where the line rechristens itself to the CSX Altenheim Subdivision (B&OCT).

The station building was originally built in 1915 by the Chicago and North Western Railway and is also the River Forest Park District headquarters.

The station has recently undergone renovations. The inbound platform was rebuilt along with the stairways.

Bus connections
Pace
 309 Lake Street 
 313 St. Charles Road

References

External links
Metra - River Forest
Thatcher Avenue entrance from Google Maps Street View

Metra stations in Illinois
Former Chicago and North Western Railway stations
Railway stations in Cook County, Illinois
Railway stations in the United States opened in 1915
River Forest, Illinois
Union Pacific West Line